The Midnight Man or Midnight Man may refer to:

Film and television 
 The Midnight Man (1917 film), a 1917 film starring Jack Mulhall
 The Midnight Man (1919 film), a 1919 film starring James J. Corbett
 The Midnight Man (1974 film), a 1974 film starring Burt Lancaster
 Midnight Man (1995 film), a 1995 film starring Lorenzo Lamas
 Midnight Man (miniseries), a 2008 television serial starring James Nesbitt
 The Midnight Man (2016 crime film), a 2016 crime film
 The Midnight Man (2016 horror film), a 2016 film starring Robert Englund and Lin Shaye

Music 
 Midnight Man (album), a 1966 album by Davey Graham
 "Midnight Man", a 1985 single by Flash and the Pan
 "Midnight Man" (Sandra song), 1987
 "Midnight Man" (Nick Cave and the Bad Seeds song), 2008
"Midnight Man", a song by the James Gang from the 1971 album Thirds

Comics 
 Midnight Man (comics), a Marvel Comics character